Wajxaklajun (pronounced ) (also known as Ystapalapán, Yolk'u, El Calvario, Carvao and Curvao) is a ruin of the ancient Maya civilization situated adjacent to the modern town of San Mateo Ixtatán, in the Huehuetenango Department of Guatemala. Wajxaklajun is considered to be the most important archaeological site in the San Mateo Ixtatán area. The site has been dated to the Classic period (c. 250–900 AD). The Chuj Maya consider the city to have been built by their ancestors. The site has similarities with other nearby highland Maya ruins; it is unusual for the presence of a number of stelae, a feature more associated with lowland sites during the Classic period, probably indicating some level of exchange with lowland cities.

Etymology

Wajxaklajun means "eighteen" in the Chuj language; this has been interpreted as deriving from the site originally consisting of eighteen mounds. This is a modern interpretation however, and it is possible that the name originally derived from a Maya calendrical name. A longer form of the name has been recorded as Chonjab' Tepan Wajxaklajun; this translates as "town and temple eighteen", from chonhap "town", and tepan "church". Alternative names for the site include Yolk'u (meaning "in the sun") and El Calvario, sometimes contracted to Carvao, or Curvao. At the time of the Spanish conquest of Guatemala, Wajxaklajun was given the Nahuatl name Ystapalapán (meaning "place of salt"); this was later modified to Ystatlan ("abundance of salt" in Nahuatl).

Location

Interactions with neighbouring groups
The site is likely to have had trade links with highland Chiapas, in Mexico, and indirectly with the Maya lowlands. The Chuj are believed to have traded salt from the local springs with the Tojolabal Maya in return for cacao. Local tradition holds that the Chuj captured the salt springs from the Tojolabal in battle.

Site description
The main axis of the site has an orientation of S 52° E, aligned along the spur occupied by the ruins. The site is distributed over three different levels, consisting of the ground level of the ridge, an area of elevated terrain to the northeast, and a depression to the southwest. The elevation and the depression were both natural features that were incorporated into the pre-Columbian town. Several range structures are situated upon the northeastern portion of the ridge, and upon the elevation, with a view across the valley to nearby salt springs. The slope occupying the southwestern portion of the site was modified with the construction of five stepped platforms, in a similar manner to that of Mesoamerican pyramids. The lower portion of the site supports a large structure that was probably a pyramid.

Unusually, Wajxaklajun possesses a number of stelae. Stelae were rarely erected in the highlands after the Preclassic period, and their presence at the site may indicate contacts with the Maya lowlands, where a strong tradition of raising stelae existed during the Classic period. Wajxaklajun is close to Quen Santo, a Classic-period site with hieroglyphic inscriptions.

The first modern investigator to mention the ruins was Franz Termer, a German who visited the site in 1926, and mentioned it in print the following year. La Farge and Byres published a detailed description of the site in 1931. Investigators in the first half of the 20th century identified close similarities between Wajxaklajun and nearby sites in Chiapas, such as Tenam Puente and Chinkultic, as well as similarities with Zaculeu, the Mam capital, near modern Huehuetenango city.

La Farge and Byres described the site in terms of three levels.

Level 1

This level consists of the highest portion of the site, occupying the northern portion of the ridge. A portion of the southeastern side of Level 1 is exposed bedrock; the rest of the southeast side, together with the southwest side, have been terraced into steps. Access to Level 1 from Level 2 is presumed to have been by a stairway on the southeast side, but any evidence of these has been eroded by a modern path.Mound E is to the southeast of Building 10. It occupied an intermediary terrace between Levels 1 and 2, on the southeast side of Level 1.Mound G is situated at the northern extreme of the archaeological site. The building stands atop an artificially levelled terrace. The terrain drops away sharply on the northeast, southeast and southwest sides.

Level 2

This level lies immediately southeast of Level 1. This terrace extends along the southeastern base of Level 1 and across the northeastern side of Level 2, where steps lead down to Plaza III. On a narrow stretch of the terrace between Plazas I and II are five plain stelae.Plaza I is a small depression in the terrace supporting Mounds A and E, and is at the same level as the main Level 2.Plaza II is to the southeast of Mound A.Plaza III is to the northeast of Mound A, to which it was probably the main approach.Mound A dominates this level. The northeastern side is badly ruined, and borders on Plaza III.Mound B is the remains of a small structure overlooking Level 3. It is at the extreme southeast of Level 2. It is immediately southeast of Mound B.Mound C is another small structure overlooking Level 3. It is also at the extreme southeast of Level 2. It is to the southwest of Mound B, and south of Mound A.Mound D is a small, badly ruined mound in the middle of Plaza II. It supports a modern wooden cross.

Level 3
Level 3 is the lowest level, and represents the natural ground level on this part of the ridge.Mound H is a badly ruined mound, southwest of the main structures on Levels 1 and 2, an axis with Mound E and former Mound I.Mound I was a small, badly ruined structure southwest of the principal structures on Levels 1 and 2. It lay between Mounds E and H.

Threats

The archeological site is endangered by the urban growth of San Mateo Ixtatán, with the building of new homes taking place on top of the ruins. The demand for land for building is such that the municipal authorities lack the incentive to protect the pre-Columbian remains.

Local traditions
The local Chuj Maya inhabitants of San Mateo Ixtatán consider the ruins to have been built by their ancestors, who were either killed by the Spanish invaders or fled to the hills. These ancestors are understood to have built the monumental architecture in order to be remembered by future generations, which relates well to the current understanding by archaeologists that such architecture was related to particular lineages, and was associated with ancestor worship. The modern Chuj regard the ruins as a sacred place, and it is still the focus of traditional festivities. Tojolabal inhabitants of Chiapas carry out pilgrimages to Wajxaklajun in order to perform ceremonies.

See also
Kʼatepan

Notes

References

 (2012) A Dictionary of the Chuj (Mayan) Language As Spoken in San Mateo Ixtatán, Huehuetenango, Guatemala ca. 1964–65 Tallahassee, Florida, US: Jaguar Tours via Mesoweb.
Middle American research series, 3. (New Orleans, Louisiana, US: Department of Middle American Research, Tulane University) pp. 218–222. 
 (2008). La ciudadanía del pueblo chuj en México: Una dialéctica negativa de identidades (in Spanish). Archived from the original on 2 February 2012. San Cristóbal de Las Casas, Mexico: El Colegio de la Frontera Sur – Unidad San Cristóbal de Las Casas. Retrieved 2015-06-02.
 (2001). Eleuterio Cahuec del Valle, ed. Historia y Memorias de la Comunidad Étnica Chuj (in Spanish) II (Versión escolar ed.). Guatemala: Universidad Rafael Landívar/UNICEF/FODIGUA. Archived from the original on 2009-02-05.
 (December 2010) Plan de Desarrollo San Mateo Ixtatán, Huehuetenango 2011-2025 (in Spanish) (Guatemala City, Guatemala: Secretaría de Planificación y Programación de la Presidencia). Retrieved 2015-06-29. Archived from the original on 2015-06-29.
 (2013) Interpretaciones mayas de los sitios arqueológicos: un análisis (in Spanish) In Cairo Carou, Heriberto; Cabezas González, Almudena; Mallo Gutiérrez, Tomás; Campo García, Esther del; Carpio Martín, José. XV Encuentro de Latinoamericanistas Españoles, Nov 2012, Madrid, Spain: Trama editorial; CEEIB, pp. 252–271, 2013. <halshs-00873762>
(Mexicon) 30 (4):86–93. . 

Further reading

 (2015) Sowing the stone: sacred geography and cultural continuity. Economy among the Highland Maya of Guatemala Estudios de Cultura Maya (Mexico City, Mexico: Centro de Estudios Mayas del Instituto de Investigaciones Filológicas de la Universidad Nacional Autónoma de México) 45' (45):171–189.  

Maya sites in Guatemala
Huehuetenango Department
Maya Classic Period
Maya sites that survived the end of the Classic Period